Protuberonotum roitmani is a species of beetle in the family Cerambycidae, the only species in the genus Protuberonotum.

References

Compsocerini